Post Mortem is the second album by the American heavy metal band Black Tide, released on August 23, 2011. The album was produced by Josh Wilbur and GGGarth. It is the band's first album to feature guitarist Austin Diaz, after the departure of Alex Nuñez in 2008.

Recording, release and promotion
The album was originally intended to be self-titled and was set for release in February 2011, but it was later announced that the album would be titled Post Mortem and the release date would be pushed back to August 23, 2011. To date, three singles have been released, along with an additional promotional digital single.

The songs "That Fire", "Let It Out" and "Into the Sky" were featured on the Al Cielo EP as Spanish re-recordings with alternative names.

"Honest Eyes" is featured on the soundtrack and opening cinematic for the 2012 video game Street Fighter X Tekken.

"That Fire" is featured on the soundtrack of EA Sports' NHL 12 and is played before any game the player manually plays.

Singles
On September 17, 2010, the band released the first single off the album - "Bury Me" for digital download and on a CD single. The CD single featured a b-side, entitled "Honest Eyes", which was later released as a stand-alone digital only single.
The second official single from the album, "Walking Dead Man", was released digitally on May 23, 2011. A music video soon followed on June 14, 2011. 
The third single from the album, entitled "That Fire" was released on June 21, 2011 and a music video for the song followed on June 23, 2011.

The band has also released acoustic versions of the songs "That Fire", and "Fight Til The Bitter End" via their YouTube account.

Sales
During its first week on sale, Post Mortem sold about 5,800 copies, landing it at number 73 on the Billboard 200 chart which was the same as their previous album Light from Above.

Track listing

Personnel

Black Tide
Gabriel Garcia – lead vocals,  lead guitar
Austin Diaz – rhythm guitar, backing vocals
Zakk Sandler – bass, backing vocals
Steven Spence – drums, percussion

Production
Garth "GGGarth" Richardson – production
Josh Wilbur - additional production

Additional personnel
Matthew Tuck - vocals on "Ashes"

References

2011 albums
Black Tide albums
Interscope Records albums
Albums produced by Garth Richardson